De Burghs Bridge is a road bridge that carries the Lane Cove Road, part of the A3, across the Lane Cove River in Macquarie Park, Sydney, Australia. The bridge stretches from Macquarie Park in the south to West Pymble in the north.

History 
The current De Burghs Bridge is the second bridge with this name to cross the Lane Cove River in this area.

First bridge 

The first bridge with this name was designed in 1899 by Ernest de Burgh, after whom the bridge is named, and was opened on 23 February 1901.

The old bridge was destroyed by bushfire in January 1994. The northern abutment on the ground is still visible, as are parts of the supporting piers. The new bridge offers a vantage point to view the remnants of the original structure.

Second bridge 
The bridge was replaced by two large high-level multi-lane separate concrete bridges, built alongside each other, that opened on 15 December 1967. The current bridge is a six-lane bridge that, unlike the original timber truss, is perpendicular to the river. This demonstrates how far road and bridge building had progressed by the 1960s, as previously it was dictated by the form of the land. One can see how the newer road and bridge is built right over any land formations, in contrast to the winding old road.

De Burghs Bridge is similar in form and function to Roseville Bridge, being a high-level multi-lane bridge replacing a low level, narrow bridge as well as windy approach roads.

De Burghs Bridge is an important part of the A3, a significant north–south artery across metropolitan Sydney which is the next road that connects the northern suburbs and the lower northern suburbs after (to the east of) Pennant Hills Road. The bridge carries three lanes of traffic each way and a pedestrian walkway on either side of the bridge. A plaque placed on the bridge pays tribute to the old bridge. It was placed there in 1988 before the destruction of the old bridge.

See also

 List of bridges in Sydney

Notes

References

External links 
 
 
 

Bridges completed in 1901
Bridges completed in 1967
Bridges in Sydney
Concrete bridges in Australia
Lane Cove River
Road bridges in New South Wales
1901 establishments in Australia
1967 establishments in Australia
1967 disestablishments in Australia